Dark Enchantment is  a 1949 Australian play by Max Afford. It premiered at the Minerva Theatre in Kings Cross Sydney in 1949.

It later toured English provinces.

It was adapted for radio on the ABC in 1960.

Plot
A young woman becomes obsessed with a ventriloquist.

References

External links
Australian productions at AusStage

Australian plays
1949 plays